Arthur F. Black House is a historic house in Kingman, Arizona. It was built in 1925 and listed on the National Register of Historic Places in 1993.

History
The house was built in 1919, and a second floor was added in 1933. The house is in the style of Spanish Colonial Revival. Cecil E. Chilton was the first contractor and Mr. Black did the building of the second floor. The house has a native stone wall and an open veranda and balcony. The lumber for the 1933 addition came from an original high school gym.

Mr. Black was the mining foreman at the Golconda Mine for about 4 years, a railroad engineer for 3 years, and partner in Kingman Motor Co. (Ford Dealership). He started the Boulder Dam Line, Kingman to Las Vegas line and adding to Phoenix; it handled passengers and freight. He is known as the Father of U. S. Route 93 and helped in creating U. S. Route 66 from the Old Trails Highway. He also formed the first cab company in Kingman, called Kingman Cab Co.

References

Houses on the National Register of Historic Places in Arizona
Houses completed in 1925
Houses in Kingman, Arizona
Spanish Colonial Revival architecture in the United States
National Register of Historic Places in Kingman, Arizona